Bakirtzis is a Greek surname, from Turkish bakırcı, "coppersmith". Notable persons with this name include:
Anastasios Bakirtzis (born 1956), Greek engineer
Evripidis Bakirtzis (1895–1947), Greek soldier

Greek-language surnames
Surnames